The Dovolja Monastery is a Serbian Orthodox monastery located on the right river banks of the Tara, near Pljevlja, in the village of Premćani within the hamlet of Dovolja. It is dedicated to the Assumption of the Holy Mother of God. It is believed to have been founded by King Stefan Milutin (r.  	1282–1321) at the end of the 13th century. It was first mentioned in 1513. It is ecclesiastically administrated by the Eparchy of Mileševa. Some time after 1699, the relics of Archbishop Arsenije I were moved from Dovolja to the Dobrilovina Monastery.

References

13th-century Serbian Orthodox church buildings
Nemanjić dynasty endowments
Serbian Orthodox monasteries in Montenegro
Pljevlja Municipality
Medieval Montenegro
16th-century Serbian Orthodox church buildings
Christian monasteries established in the 16th century